Lake Stratos is an artificial lake near Stratos in Aetolia-Acarnania, western Greece. The lake is fed and drained by the river Acheloos. It was formed by the Stratos Dam, completed in 1989. Its maximum capacity is 80,000,000 m³ of water. Its area is 7.4 km2. It is used for the generation of hydroelectric power.

References

Reservoirs in Greece
Landforms of Aetolia-Acarnania
Landforms of Western Greece